Erratencrinurus is a genus of trilobites in the order Phacopida, that existed during the upper Ordovician in what is now northern Germany. It was described from glacial erratics by Krueger in 1972, and the type species is Erratencrinurus capricornu.

References

External links
 Erratencrinurus at the Paleobiology Database

Encrinuridae genera
Fossil taxa described in 1972
Ordovician trilobites
Fossils of Germany
Paleozoic life of Ontario
Verulam Formation
Paleozoic life of Quebec